Geraldo Moreira da Silva Júnior, better known as Geraldo (Duque de Caxias, 6 February 1974) is a Brazilian footballer who acts as the attacking midfielder. He currently plays for Volta Redonda.

Career

Gerard has served in several clubs: Vasco EC (Sergipe), Confiança, Vitória de Guimarães (Portugal), Atlético Paranaense, Bahia, Al-Shabab (UAE), Sport, Coritiba   and Náutico.

Arriving at the Náutico, caused controversy because it had been the idol archrival Sport in 2001, but was dismissed in 2005 for being with a football below expectations.

In 2009, he was hired by the Ceará to the disputes of the League of Ceará, Ceará, where he led the runner-up, even more so in the same year one of the biggest victory of the athlete, got together with a group players focused on the goal that was to take the Ceará the elite of Brazilian football and do not reach (club and athlete) to a financial arrangement for the Geraldo will Itumbiara.

In 2010, played in the Campeonato Goiano by Itumbiara was not any better in their presentations, the team was not going well, until the Ceará hired to try repairing your midfield has failed in the 2010 World Cup squads.

Contract
 Ceará.

References

External links
zerozerofootball.com

1974 births
Living people
Brazilian footballers
Campeonato Brasileiro Série A players
Sport Club do Recife players
Coritiba Foot Ball Club players
Clube Náutico Capibaribe players
Itumbiara Esporte Clube players
Ceará Sporting Club players
Esporte Clube Vitória players
Fortaleza Esporte Clube players
Association football midfielders
People from Duque de Caxias, Rio de Janeiro
Sportspeople from Rio de Janeiro (state)